Macquarie Shire was a local government area in the Orana region of New South Wales, Australia.

Macquarie Shire was proclaimed on 7 March 1906, one of 134 shires created after the passing of the Local Government (Shires) Act 1905. 

The shire office was in Wellington. Other towns and villages in the shire included Stuart Town.

Macquarie Shire was amalgamated on 1 January 1950 with the Municipality of Wellington and part of Cobbora Shire to form Wellington Shire.

References

Former local government areas of New South Wales
1906 establishments in Australia
1950 disestablishments in Australia